FPN may mean:

 Faculty of Political Science in Sarajevo
 Faculty of Political Sciences, University of Belgrade
 Family nurse practitioner in the United States
 Feldpost number, used for transmission of mail to German military in WWII
 Feminist Peace Network in the United States
 Fixed penalty notice, in the UK, a notification of what is usually a minor fine for an alleged criminal offence

Science and technology
 Federated portal network, a software architecture
 Ferroportin, a protein
 Filtered-popping network in computer science
 Fixed-pattern noise in digital imaging